Gaoyi is a county of Hebei Province, North China, it is under the administration of the prefecture-level city of Shijiazhuang, the capital of the province.

Administrative divisions
Towns:
Gaoyi Town, Daying Town, Fucun Town

Townships:
Zhonghan Township, Wancheng Township

Climate

Transport
G4 Beijing–Hong Kong and Macau Expressway
China National Highway 107

References

 
County-level divisions of Hebei
Shijiazhuang